Psycho in the Wax Museum is an EP by the American punk rock band Misfits. It features two songs that were previously unreleased and were recorded during the American Psycho sessions. The versions included are instrumental, as it has been reported that the vocals were never recorded ("Angel Baby" has previously been performed live at soundcheck with vocals by Michale Graves). The single was only available via an offer from Misfits Records where proofs of purchase had to be sent in from Osaka Popstar's Osaka Popstar and the American Legends of Punk, Balzac's Beyond the Darkness and the Misfits' Project 1950.

The cover art is by Butch Lukic and features the Misfits' mascot Crimson Ghost. The vinyl itself features an etched pattern of Fiend Skulls in the area that doesn't feature music. In 2011, Michale Graves recorded new vocals for the track "Angel Baby", renaming it "We Are the Wicked".

Track listing 
 "Angel Baby" - 3:02
 "Death of the Fallen Angel" - 2:33

Personnel
Jerry Only – bass
Doyle Wolfgang Von Frankenstein – guitar
Dr. Chud – drums

References

External links 
Misfits Official Website
Misfits Records Official Website

Misfits (band) EPs
2006 EPs